Šambron (Shambron) is a village and municipality in Stará Ľubovňa District in the Prešov Region of northern Slovakia.

History
In historical records the village was first mentioned in 1411.

Geography
The municipality lies at an altitude of 672 metres and covers an area of 12.953 km². It has a population of about 429 people.

References

External links
 Šambron - The Carpathian Connection
 http://www.statistics.sk/mosmis/eng/run.html

Villages and municipalities in Stará Ľubovňa District